Freda Farrell Waldon (August 29, 1898, in Winnipeg – 1973) was a Canadian librarian, who was the first president of the Canada Library Association.

References

External links
 Biography of Freda Farrell Waldon at Ex Libris Association

1898 births
1973 deaths
Canadian librarians
Canadian women librarians